C-X-C motif chemokine 11 (CXCL11) is a protein that in humans is encoded by the CXCL11 gene.

C-X-C motif chemokine 11 is a small cytokine belonging to the CXC chemokine family that is also called Interferon-inducible T-cell alpha chemoattractant (I-TAC) and Interferon-gamma-inducible protein 9 (IP-9).  It is highly expressed in peripheral blood leukocytes, pancreas and liver, with moderate levels in thymus, spleen and lung and low expression levels were in small intestine, placenta and prostate.

Gene expression of CXCL11 is strongly induced by IFN-γ and IFN-β, and weakly induced by IFN-α. This chemokine elicits its effects on its target cells by interacting with the cell surface chemokine receptor CXCR3, with a higher affinity than do the other ligands for this receptor, CXCL9 and CXCL10. CXCL11 is chemotactic for activated T cells.  Its gene is located on human chromosome 4 along with many other members of the CXC chemokine family.

Biomarkers

CXCL9, -10, -11 have proven to be valid biomarkers for the development of heart failure and left ventricular dysfunction, suggesting an underlining pathophysiological relation between levels of these chemokines and the development of adverse cardiac remodeling.

References

External links

Further reading 

 
 
 
 
 
 
 
 
 
 
 
 
 
 
 
 
 
 
 

Cytokines